is a film released in 1972 by Toei Company. It is the second in the Female Prisoner Scorpion series. It stars Meiko Kaji and is directed by Shunya Itō, who also directed the first film in the series Female Prisoner 701: Scorpion.

Plot
Nami Matsushima (Meiko Kaji) is locked up and bound in underground solitary confinement. She makes a weapon out of a spoon by holding it in her mouth and grinding it against the concrete floor. The prison's chief warden, Goda, is to be promoted to a higher post shortly. When an inspector visits the prison, Matsushima is brought out of confinement for one day. During the inspection, Matsushima makes a surprise attack on Goda and scratches his face. The other prisoners start to riot, but the guards defuse the situation.

The prisoners are punished by being sent to an intensive labour camp. Believing that Matsushima may inspire the other prisoners to revolt, Goda assigns four guards to publicly rape her. Returning from the labour camp, Matsushima is in a van with six other prisoners, one of whom is Oba (Kayoko Shiraishi). The other prisoners beat Matsushima, who falls lifeless and bleeding. The guards are alerted that Matsushima is feared dead. When they stop the van to inspect her, Matsushima strangles and kills one of the guards, and Oba and the other prisoners capture the other guard and blow up the van. When Goda sees the van's ruins, he sends search parties to look for Matsushima.

The prisoners escape to an abandoned village, where Oba reveals her crime: when she found her husband cheating on her, she drowned her 2-year-old son and killed her unborn baby by stabbing herself. In the village, the prisoners find a mysterious old woman wielding a dagger. A surreal sequence follows, where the crimes of each of the prisoners are explained. The old woman gives Matsushima her knife before she dies; her body then turns into leaves and is blown away by the wind. The prisoners see a town, where they decide to steal new clothes from to escape. Waiting for nightfall, they hide out in an abandoned hut.

One of the prisoners, Haru, sneaks out of the hut and into her own home, which is nearby. There she is reunited with her son, but also two jailers. They offer to set Haru free if she reveals the others' locations. Distraught, Haru goes away. One of the guards follows her while the other returns to Goda. Matsushima kills the guard following Haru. During the short scuffle, one of the prisoners is shot accidentally and dies shortly after from her wound.

A sightseeing tourist group is passing through the region are warned to look out for the prisoners. Three sexually aggressive men from the group find one of the prisoners is returning from the river, rape her repeatedly, then throw her down a cliff. The other prisoners find her body and give chase to the men. They find the tour bus and hijack it. Oba and the prisoners torture, strip and bind the three men. They also harass the other passengers.

Another surreal sequence shows the prisoners being ostracised by society, for which the prisoners are taking revenge. As the bus approaches a checkpoint, Oba throws Matsushima out of the bus as a decoy. Matsushima is captured, but Goda's men arrange a roadblock in front of the bus, consisting of a large truck with Haru's son on it. The bus is stopped and Haru rushes out to meet her son. As the guards try to catch her, she is shot by sniper guards. Oba then orders the prisoners to kill the hostages. She kills the bus driver and commandeers the bus, circumventing the roadblock.

At night, the bus is cornered by the police. Goda sends Matsushima to the prisoners to learn the hostages' status. Matsushima lies that the hostages have been killed, and the police lead a charge on the bus. The prisoners throw the three men out, who are killed by police bullets. In the ensuing fight, all the prisoners except Oba die. Oba is injured and set to return to prison in the same vehicle as Matsushima. Goda orders the guards to kill Matsushima on the way as if she had attempted to escape. The guards stop at a junkyard and are about to shoot her, when Oba saves her by biting the guard. Matsushima kills the guards. The next morning, Oba dies in the junkyard. Matsushima is finally loose.

Goda is promoted and now has a job in the city. Matsushima tracks him down and kills him by stabbing him several times. The film ends with a surreal sequence of all the female prisoners of the jailhouse wearing their striped prison dresses running free in the city, passing Matsushima's dagger amongst each other.

Cast
 Meiko Kaji as Nami Matsushima, the Scorpion
 Fumio Watanabe as Inspector Goda
 Kayoko Shiraishi as Oba
 Yukie Kagawa as Haru
 Yuki Arasa
 Eiko Yanami
 Hideo Murota
 Rokko Toura

Release
Female Prisoner Scorpion: Jailhouse 41 was released in Japan on December 30, 1972.

Reception
In a retrospective review, AllMovie described the film as "an outrageously stylish and imaginative women-in-prison film." and that the film "bombards the viewer with outrageously brutal images, including the aftermath of a rather creative castration; lyrical images such as leaves turning from brown-orange to gray for one death scene and a waterfall turning red for another; and Kabuki-like fantasy sequences that are interspersed between the action." The review noted that the story line "could be enjoyed as camp or even praised as a critique of society's mistreatment of women, although the unpleasant scenes of rape and torture of women may ruin some people's enjoyment of the film." Sight & Sound described the film as "artful exploitation", noting that "All the male-female relationships are portrayed as antagonistic and abusive, and there is little empathy among the women themselves" as well as that "Although there are scenes of rape, torture and molestation, the tough content is offset by the film's formal beauty -- it's a rare scene that passes without some kind of visual or aural flourish."

Video Watchdog described the film as "the breakout rediscovery of the new millennium."

References

Bibliography

External links
 
 

1972 films
1970s action thriller films
1970s crime thriller films
Live-action films based on manga
Films directed by Shunya Itō
1970s Japanese-language films
Pink films
Toei Company films
Discotek Media
Japanese LGBT-related films
1972 LGBT-related films
1970s Japanese films